José Denis Conde (born January 2, 1971 in Montevideo, Uruguay) is a former Uruguayan footballer who played for clubs of Uruguay, Argentina, Chile, Bolivia, El Salvador and Guatemala.

Teams
  Defensor Sporting 1989-1991
  Huracán Buceo 1992-1993
  Sportivo Cerrito 1994
  Rampla Juniors 1995
  Nueva Chicago 1995-1997
  Sportivo Italiano 1997
  Chacarita Juniors 1997-1998
  Deportivo Español 1998-1999
  Racing de Montevideo 2000
  Provincial Osorno 2000
  Blooming 2001
  Rentistas 2001
  Alianza 2002
  Villa Española 2003-2004
  Alianza 2004
  Coban Imperial 2004-2005
  Uruguay Montevideo 2006
  Villa Española 2007

References
 
 

1976 births
Living people
Uruguayan footballers
Uruguayan expatriate footballers
Racing Club de Montevideo players
Defensor Sporting players
Uruguay Montevideo players
Sportivo Cerrito players
Villa Española players
Rampla Juniors players
C.A. Rentistas players
Huracán Buceo players
Club Blooming players
Cobán Imperial players
Alianza F.C. footballers
Nueva Chicago footballers
Sportivo Italiano footballers
Deportivo Español footballers
Chacarita Juniors footballers
Provincial Osorno footballers
Bolivian Primera División players
Chilean Primera División players
Expatriate footballers in Argentina
Uruguayan expatriate sportspeople in Argentina
Expatriate footballers in Chile
Uruguayan expatriate sportspeople in Chile
Expatriate footballers in Bolivia
Uruguayan expatriate sportspeople in Bolivia
Expatriate footballers in El Salvador
Uruguayan expatriate sportspeople in El Salvador
Expatriate footballers in Guatemala
Uruguayan expatriate sportspeople in Guatemala
Association football midfielders